"Tomber la chemise" (English: literally "Take Off Your Shirt" but the meaning is "Get ready to play hard") is a 1998 song by the Toulousian collective Zebda.  The song was released on 7 June 1999 as part of the first single from Zebda's third album Essence ordinaire and received a successful reception in France, where it reached number-one on the singles chart and won two awards. This summer 1999 hit song "Tomber la chemise" was part of a sudden popularity trend by rappers of immigrant origins in France at that time.

Structure and lyrics
Although "Tomber la chemise" appeared to be an outsider in the race to the top of the charts that summer, this highly political song became the hit that finally brought Zebda national recognition after eleven years of existence. According to an expert of French charts, this song "devotes an expression of the spoken language, becoming inseparable from this song, and bases its originality on the regional savour that the accent of the Midi conveys". The melody is similar to those of Regg'Lyss songs.

Chart performance and awards
In France, the song went straight to #11 on 12 June 1999. It entered the top 10 the next week and stayed in it for 20 weeks, three of them atop. Thereafter, it kept dropping and fell off the Top 100 after 30 weeks. It achieved diamond certification status awarded by the French provider, SNEP. In addition to being a commercial success, the song went on to be named the best French song of 2000 at both the Victoires de la musique awards and the NRJ Music Awards.

In Belgium (Wallonia), "Tomber la chemise" remained on the Ultratop 40 for 19 weeks. It started at #22 on 7 August 1999, climbed quickly and finally peaked at #3 in its seventh week. It totaled ten weeks in the Top 10.

Cover versions and parodies
In 1999, the song was parodied by Le Festival Roblès under the title "Solder la Chemise" ("Sell Off Your Shirt"). Les Fatals Picards, a French band which participated in the Eurovision Song Contest 2007, also parodied the song under the name "Monter le pantalon" ("Pull Up Your Pants") on its album Pamplemousse mécanique (A Clockwork Grapefruit).

In 2002, the song was covered by Yannick Noah, Michèle Laroque and Francis Cabrel on the album Tous dans le même bateau (All in the Same Boat), also available on Les Enfoirés's the best of La compil' (vol. 3), released in 2005.

Track listings
 CD single
 "Tomber la chemise" — 4:25
 "Quinze ans" — 4:50
 "Le pont du carrousel" — 4:06

Certifications and sales

Charts

References

External links 
 

1998 songs
1999 singles
SNEP Top Singles number-one singles
Zebda songs
Barclay (record label) singles